Richard Evelyn Byrd III (February 19, 1920 – c. October 3, 1988), usually referred to as Richard E. Byrd Jr.,  was a United States naval officer, Antarctic explorer, and the son of Admiral Richard Evelyn Byrd.

Biography

Early life
Richard Evelyn Byrd III was born on February 19, 1920 to famed naval aviator and explorer Richard Evelyn Byrd Jr. and his wife, Marie Donaldson Ames. The younger Richard was a graduate of Milton Academy and Harvard College.

Military career
During World War II he was commissioned an ensign in the Naval Reserve on April 6, 1942 and was promoted to lieutenant (junior grade) on January 1, 1944. He was promoted to lieutenant by the war's end and was promoted to the rank of lieutenant commander in the Naval Reserve after the war. He accompanied his father on Operation Highjump to explore Antarctica in 1946.

Personal life
In 1948, he married Emily Saltonstall (d. 2006), the daughter of longtime Massachusetts Senator Leverett Saltonstall. They divorced in 1960.  He had five children and six grandchildren.  He worked as a financial advisor with Morgan Stanley.

Death
He died on or about October 3, 1988, at the age of 68. His body was found in a warehouse in Baltimore, Maryland. He had gone missing on September 13, 1988, after being placed on a train in Boston bound for Washington, D.C.  Byrd was supposed to attend a National Geographic Society event honoring the 100th anniversary of his father's birth, but never arrived.

The cause of his death was dehydration and malnutrition which resulted from Alzheimer's disease.

He was buried, near his father, in Arlington National Cemetery.

References

External links
1980 interview of Byrd by The Christian Science Monitor

1920 births
1988 deaths
Businesspeople from Boston
Military personnel from Massachusetts
Explorers of Antarctica
Burials at Arlington National Cemetery
Harvard College alumni
Milton Academy alumni
20th-century American businesspeople
Missing person cases in Maryland
Deaths from Alzheimer's disease
Neurological disease deaths in Maryland
United States Navy personnel of World War II
United States Navy officers
Deaths by starvation
United States Navy reservists
Richard Evelyn Byrd III